Stigmella crataegifoliella is a moth of the family Nepticulidae. It is found in North America in Ohio, Pennsylvania, Kentucky and Ontario.

The wingspan is 3.5-4.5 mm. Adults are on wing in May and again in August in Ohio. There are two generations per year.

The larvae feed on Crataegus species. They mine the leaves of their host plant. The mine is comparatively short, rapidly increasing in diameter. There is an irregular line of frass running through the mine. The larvae are bright green and the cocoon is reddish brown.

External links
Nepticulidae of North America
A taxonomic revision of the North American species of Stigmella (Lepidoptera: Nepticulidae)

Nepticulidae
Moths described in 1861
Moths of North America